The Arch of Augustus may mean the triumphal arch of Augustus at any of the following sites:

Arch of Augustus (Aosta)
Arch of Augustus (Fano)
Arch of Augustus (Rimini)
Arch of Augustus, Rome
Arch of Augustus (Susa)
Etruscan Arch at Perugia